White Heath is an unincorporated census-designated place in Piatt County, Illinois, United States. As of the 2010 census, its population was 290.

Geography
White Heath is located in Sangamon Township.

History

A plaque in the community center states that the area was settled by a Mr. White and a Mr. Heath. There is one school, White Heath Elementary School. Their mascot (when a junior high school and had sports) was a Warrior.  The school is now part of Monticello Community District School #25.

White Heath, located about 15 miles west of Champaign, IL, was platted in 1872 by James Deland at the junction point of two pioneer railroads that were constructing through the area - the Monticello Railroad (Champaign-Monticello-Decatur) and the Havana, Mason City, Lincoln & Eastern Ry through the named towns.  Mr. Deland was an incorporator of the H,MC, L & E and owned property at the junction point.  Being a railroad junction, it was expected White Heath could develop into a major town, but when this failed to materialize, Mr. Deland sold his land interests in the town.  The two pioneer railroads were later consolidated and the lines eventually became part of the Illinois Central.

The Monticello Railway Museum purchased 7 miles of the former Illinois Central Decatur and Havana District branch lines between Monticello and White Heath in July 1987.   White Heath is located at the northern end of the Museum's purchase.  The trackage arrangement in White Heath forms a complete "wye" which can be used to turn trains.  The depot, built in 1942 to replace an earlier structure, is still standing although it is owned by a local resident and not the Museum.  It is unused at present.  The Decatur District (MRyM's "Central District") has been refurbished for operation at 10 mph to White Heath and is occasionally used for the Museum's "Railroad Days" event on the third weekend of September every year.  At the present time, privately owned freight cars are stored on the north 2 miles of the Museum's trackage into White Heath as a fundraiser.  When the track is completely refurbished, Museum trains may enter White Heath and use the Wye.

Notable person
The zoologist Richard D. Alexander was born in White Heath in 1929.

See also
Shady Rest

References

External links
Sangamon Township Election Candidates
61884 - via city-data.com

Census-designated places in Piatt County, Illinois
Census-designated places in Illinois